Carrollton High School may refer to:

Carrollton High School (Carrollton, Georgia) — Carrollton, Georgia
Carrollton High School (Carrollton, Kentucky) — Carrollton, Kentucky
Carrollton High School (Carrollton, Illinois) — Carrollton, Illinois
Carrollton High School (Carrollton, Michigan) — Carrollton, Michigan
Carrollton High School (Carrollton, Ohio) — Carrollton, Ohio
Carrollton High School (Texas) — Carrollton, Texas
Carrollton Area Career Center — Carrollton, Missouri
West Carrollton High School — West Carrollton, Ohio